Henrike Handrup (born 9 March 1983) is a German former Paralympic cyclist who competes at international elite competitions. She is a World road racing champion and a track bronze medalist has competed at the 2012 Summer Paralympics but did not medal.

References

External links
 

1983 births
Living people
German female cyclists
Paralympic cyclists of Germany
Cyclists at the 2012 Summer Paralympics
Cyclists from North Rhine-Westphalia
Sportspeople from Wuppertal
20th-century German women
21st-century German women